Harold William Taylor (20 December 1910 – 15 November 1970) was an English professional footballer who made over 170 appearances in the Football League for Clapton Orient as a right half.

Career statistics

References 

English Football League players
Association football inside forwards
Footballers from Dundee
Leyton Orient F.C. players
1910 births
1970 deaths
People from Boston, Lincolnshire
English footballers
Association football wing halves
Southport F.C. players